Vitreolina perminima is a species of sea snail, a marine gastropod mollusk in the family Eulimidae. The species is one of a number within the genus Vitreolina.

Distribution
This species occurs in the North Atlantic Ocean and in the Mediterranean Sea

Description
This micromollusk measures only 1.25 mm long. The shell is slender and rather solid. It is semitransparent and white, lightly tinged with yellowish brown on the body whorl. The apex is bluntly pointed. The shell contains 6 to 7 whorls, compressed and compact.

References

 Gofas, S.; Le Renard, J.; Bouchet, P. (2001). Mollusca, in: Costello, M.J. et al. (Ed.) (2001). European register of marine species: a check-list of the marine species in Europe and a bibliography of guides to their identification. Collection Patrimoines Naturels, 50: pp. 180–213

External links
 To World register of Marine Species

perminima
Gastropods described in 1883